Ajudanabad (also Romanized as Ājūdānābād and Ajūdānābād) is a village in Abish Ahmad Rural District, Abish Ahmad District, Kaleybar County, East Azerbaijan Province, Iran. At the 2006 census, its population was 554, in 104 families.

References 

Populated places in Kaleybar County